Central Park is a large municipal park located near the geographic center of Santa Clarita, California. It is accessible via Bouquet Canyon Road, which parallels Bouquet Creek along the northern edge of the park.

Facilities
The park features a variety of recreational facilities, including four outdoor basketball courts, four baseball diamonds, several multipurpose fields, and a children's playground. In addition, the park features an extensive trail system linking the park with the surrounding highlands and the city's bikeway network.

Conservatory garden
Near the top of the Central Park hill lies the headquarters of the Santa Clarita Valley Water Agency, which include a Conservatory Garden and Learning Center with over 350 species of drought-resistant plants including flowers and grasses. The facility overlooks Newhall Ranch Road.

Memorials

Youth Grove
The Santa Clarita Youth Grove is a memorial dedicated to local youth who were the victims of various traffic-related incidents. The memorial was built in 2005 and takes the form of a large plinth surrounded by over 50 canted wood pillars bearing the names of each victim. An annual "Evening of Remembrance" is held at the memorial to honor the victims and promote safe driving habits.

Saugus High School shooting
On February 18, 2021, the words "In Memoriam Gracie Muehlberger and Dominic Blackwell" were added to the sign at the entrance to the park to honor the victims of the 2019 Saugus High School shooting, following a decision by the Santa Clarita Water Board on December 15, 2020. Saugus High School is across Bouquet Canyon Road from Central Park.

See also
Placerita Canyon State Park

References

Municipal parks in California
Santa Clarita, California